1924 Horus, provisional designation , is a dark asteroid from the inner regions of the asteroid belt, approximately 12 kilometers in diameter. Discovered during the Palomar–Leiden survey in 1960, it was later named after Horus from Egyptian mythology.

Orbit and classification 

Horus was discovered on 24 September 1960, by Cornelis Johannes van Houten and Ingrid van Houten-Groeneveld at Leiden, on photographic plates taken by Tom Gehrels at Palomar. On the same date, the trio of astronomers also discovered 1912 Anubis, 1923 Osiris and 5011 Ptah.

The survey designation "P-L" stands for Palomar–Leiden, named after Palomar Observatory and Leiden Observatory, which collaborated on the fruitful Palomar–Leiden survey in the 1960s. Gehrels used Palomar's Samuel Oschin telescope (also known as the 48-inch Schmidt Telescope), and shipped the photographic plates to Ingrid and Cornelis van Houten at Leiden Observatory where astrometry was carried out. The trio are credited with the discovery of several thousand asteroid discoveries.

Physical characteristics 

According to the survey carried out by NASA's Wide-field Infrared Survey Explorer with its subsequent NEOWISE mission, Horus measures 12.986 kilometers in diameter and its surface has an albedo of 0.070. The body has a rotation period of 6.183 hours.

Naming 

This minor planet was named after Horus, the falcon-headed king of the sky and the stars, and son of the Egyptian god Osiris. The official naming citation was published by the Minor Planet Center on 1 November 1979.

References

External links 
 Asteroid Lightcurve Database (LCDB), query form (info )
 Dictionary of Minor Planet Names, Google books
 Asteroids and comets rotation curves, CdR – Observatoire de Genève, Raoul Behrend
 Discovery Circumstances: Numbered Minor Planets (1)-(5000) – Minor Planet Center
 
 

001924
4023
Discoveries by Cornelis Johannes van Houten
Discoveries by Ingrid van Houten-Groeneveld
Discoveries by Tom Gehrels
Named minor planets
19600924